Gambo may refer to:

Places
 Gambo, Central African Republic, a town in the Central African Republic
 Gambo, Newfoundland and Labrador, a town in northeastern Newfoundland, Newfoundland and Labrador, Canada

Ships
 USS West Gambo (ID-3220), a United States Navy cargo ship commission from 1918 to 1919

Other uses
Gambo (rapper), a Ghanaian rapper